Nova Palmeira is a municipality in the Brazilian state of Paraíba.

References 

Populated places established in 1963
Municipalities in Paraíba